Stéphane Barthe (born 5 December 1972) is a French former racing cyclist. He won the French national road race title in 1997.

Major results

1995
 2nd Overall Tour du Loir-et-Cher
1996
 1st Stage 8 Ruban Granitier Breton
 3rd Overall Tour de Normandie
1997
 1st  Road race, National Road Championships
 1st Châteauroux Classic
 1st Stage 1 Critérium International
 2nd Overall Tour du Poitou Charentes et de la Vienne
 2nd Kuurne–Brussels–Kuurne
 2nd Paris–Mantes
 3rd Bordeaux–Caudéran
 7th A Travers le Morbihan
 7th Classic Haribo
 8th Overall Giro di Puglia
1998
 1st Stage 1 Setmana Catalana de Ciclisme
 6th Overall Tour de l'Oise
1st Stage 2b
 8th Tour de Vendée
1999
 1st Stage 3 Four Days of Dunkirk
 1st Stage 1 Critérium International
 1st Stage 3 Tour du Poitou Charentes et de la Vienne
 4th Grand Prix de Denain
 5th Overall Tour de l'Oise
2000
 3rd Overall Danmark Rundt
 5th Road race, National Road Championships
 7th Overall Four Days of Dunkirk
 10th Classic Haribo
2001
 10th Trofeo Luis Puig
2002
 1st Stage 4 Tour de Beauce
 6th Tour de la Somme
 8th Tour de Vendée
 10th Tro-Bro Léon
2003
 2nd Time trial, National Road Championships
 8th Overall Tour du Poitou Charentes et de la Vienne
 8th Tour de Vendée
2004
 1st  Overall Tour du Poitou Charentes et de la Vienne
 3rd Bordeaux–Saintes
 4th Bordeaux–Caudéran
2005
 4th Time trial, National Road Championships
 7th Overall Tour de Normandie
 7th Grand Prix de la Ville de Lillers

References

External links
 

1972 births
Living people
French male cyclists
People from Ermont
Sportspeople from Val-d'Oise
Cyclists from Île-de-France